The 2015–16 Andros Trophy is the 26th season of the Andros Trophy, a motor racing championship for automobile ice racing and motorcycle ice racing held in France and Andorra. The season begins in Val Thorens on 5 December 2015 and finishes on 13 February 2016 in Saint-Dié-des-Vosges.

Jean-Philippe Dayraut is the defending Elite Pro drivers' champion.

Teams and drivers

Elite Pro and Elite

Électrique
Every driver participates in an electric Andros Trophy car.

Féminin
Every driver participates in an FFSA Sprint Car.

AMV Cup

Calendar and results

Championship standings

Points systems

Elite Pro/Elite

Points are awarded for both the two Qualifying sessions and for the Super Final. Only the best result of both Qualifying sessions will count. Both results will count in case of a tie break. For example if Driver A becomes first in Q1 and second in Q2 and Driver B becomes third in Q1 and first in Q2, then Driver A will receive the most points. Points are awarded based on the results of the Qualifying sessions and on finishing positions of the Super Final as shown in the chart below.

In Val Thorens, at Isola 2000 with the Elite championship only, in Lans-en-Vercors – with the exception of the second round with the Elite Pro championship – at Super Besse with the Elite championship only and in Saint-Dié-des-Vosges the field was split up into two. The best half after Qualifying raced in a normal Super Final and the other half raced in a Final. If for example seven drivers raced in the Super Final then the winner of the Final would be classified as 8th.

Électrique

The Électrique championship has the same scoring system as the Elite Pro and Elite championships only with a different number of points and the Super Final is called a Final, because there was no Super Final. Only in Saint-Dié-des-Vosges the Électrique championship had a Final and a Super Final.

Féminin

Points are awarded based on the results of the Practice session and on finishing positions of the Final and Super Final as shown in the chart below.

AMV Cup

Points are awarded based on finishing positions of the Final and Super Final as shown in the chart below.

Points dropped

In the Elite Pro, Elite, Electrique and Féminin Championships each driver's two lowest-scoring rounds were dropped from their total.

Drivers' Championships

Elite Pro

Notes
† — Panis lost all his points awarded after Qualifying and the Super Final after deliberately crashing into Dayraut.

Elite

Électrique

Féminin

AMV Cup

Teams' Championship

Elite Pro/Elite
Only the best two Elite Pro drivers and the best two Elite drivers are included in the Teams' Championship. Also one team can only enter the Teams' Championship with four cars.

Notes
 The car numbers without B behind them indicate Elite Pro entries and with B behind them indicate Elite entries.

Notes

References

External links

2015 in French motorsport
2016 in French motorsport
2015 in rallying
2016 in rallying